Livingston is a city in Merced County, California, United States. According to the 2020 census, the city population was 14,172, up from 13,058 in 2010.

Location 
It lies slightly uphill from where the Southern Pacific Railroad crosses the Merced River. Highway 99 follows the Southern Pacific through the town.

History 
The Livingston post office opened in 1873, closed in 1882, and re-opened in 1883. The town was named for Dr. David Livingstone, a British explorer of Africa who was an international celebrity in the late 1800s. An error on the town's post office application resulted in the difference in spelling between his name and the town's.

Agriculture 
Livingston lies in the fertile San Joaquin Valley. Like the rest of the valley, it has long, dry summers and depends on irrigation water. The winters are mild, alternating between fog, rain, and sun, with occasional frost. The growing season is long, and there is a low risk of mold, drought, or bad weather interfering with crops. Due to deposits from the Merced River, Livingston's soil is unusually sandy, distinguishing it from the clay-based soils predominant in most of the valley. Sweet potatoes and grapes are one of the most fertile crop in Livingston, and almonds are a fertile crop in the spring.

Livingston and Merced County are a center of the agriculture industry. Livingston's largest businesses are agriculture-related. Among these are the largest poultry producer in the western United States, Foster Farms, and a dairy, Joseph Gallo Farms, which owns the largest dairy herd in the United States. Ninety percent of the sweet potatoes grown west of the Rockies are grown and packed in and around Livingston. The sweet potatoes benefit from the sandy soil. Grapes are also widely farmed near Livingston for wine, raisins, and table grapes. E & J Gallo Winery operates a major grape-pressing facility just outside the city. Almond orchards are a common sight, and the Central Valley is a key part of California's production of this crop (California produces 100% of the US domestic supply of almonds, and 80% of the world's supply). Other crops are farmed in smaller quantities, including alfalfa, corn, soybeans, peaches, melons, berries, and turf.

The League of Independent Workers of the San Joaquin Valley and United Farm Workers are active in the area.

Schools 
Livingston Union School District serves 2,400 children in and around Livingston. The district operates three elementary schools, Campus Park Elementary School, Selma Herndon Elementary School, and Yamato Colony Elementary School. Most elementary-age children are within walking distance of each school. All three elementary schools offer some form of two-way immersion instruction designed to build proficiency in both English and Spanish. Livingston Middle School serves grades 6–8.

Livingston High School is part of Merced Union High School District and serves all of Livingston as well as students from the nearby towns of Ballico and Cressey. In years past, most students from Delhi attended Livingston High School until Delhi opened its own high school, Delhi High School, in 1998. Livingston High School's foreign language department offers classes in Spanish and Punjabi.

Longview Mennonite School serves many Mennonite students in the area.

In the 1990s, Livingston schools were at the center of a controversy involving Sikh students' right to wear ceremonial daggers known as kirpans under clothing while at school. In 1995, a Federal appellate court affirmed the right to wear the kirpan if certain safety precautions are followed.

Newspapers 
The Livingston Chronicle is a weekly newspaper delivered on Saturdays. The Chronicle publishes local happenings, especially Livingston High School academic and athletic events. The Merced Sun-Star and Modesto Bee are also widely read and cover Livingston news and events. All three newspapers are owned by the McClatchy Company. The San Francisco Chronicle is also available throughout the city.

Churches 
Places of worship in Livingston and the immediately surrounding area include a Catholic church, an Apostolic Assembly, an Assemblies of God church, a Southern Baptist church, a Church of Christ, Lutheran and United Methodist churches, a Mennonite church, a United Pentecostal Church, and two Sikh Gurdwaras.

Demographics

Heritage 
The residents of Livingston are descended from people of many nations, including:

 Mexicans from Michoacán, the Yucatán, Chihuahua, Veracruz, Sinaloa, Jalisco, Oaxaca and other estados
 Central Americans from Guatemala, El Salvador, Honduras, and other countries
 People from Oklahoma and other parts of the United States of America. About 100 members of the Cherokee Nation live in the town.
 Portuguese from the Azores, Angola, and Brazil. About 10 percent of the locals speak Portuguese.
 Hindus, Sikhs and Muslims from India and Pakistan. Livingston has one of the largest communities of Sikhs in the United States.
 Japanese, mostly from Wakayama. The Livingston Farmers' Association was founded by Japanese Americans.
 Mennonites from Germany and Russia
 Armenians from the Middle East
 Hmong from Laos and Vietnam
 Cambodians from Cambodia
 Vietnamese from South Vietnam after the end of the Vietnam War
 Filipinos
 Chinese

An estimated 30 European, 25 Asian, 15 Latin American and 5 Sub-Saharan African nationalities are counted among Livingston's ethnic makeup.  There are very few African-Americans in Livingston.

The immigration continues. Most of the recent immigrants are from Mexico, Central America, Southeast Asia, the Middle East, and the Punjab.

Census figures

2010
At the 2010 census Livingston had a population of 13,058. The racial makeup of Livingston was 5,263 (40.3%) White, 106 (0.8%) African American, 348 (2.7%) Native American, 2,223 (17.0%) Asian, 18 (0.1%) Pacific Islander, 4,547 (34.8%) from other races, and 553 (4.2%) from two or more races. Hispanic or Latino of any race were 9,547 persons (73.1%).

The census reported that 13,054 people (100% of the population) lived in households, 4 (0%) lived in non-institutionalized group quarters, and no one was institutionalized.

There were 3,156 households, 1,907 (100%) had children under the age of 18 living in them, 2,014 (63.8%) were opposite-sex married couples living together, 501 (15.9%) had a female householder with no husband present, 288 (9.1%) had a male householder with no wife present.  There were 199 (6.3%) unmarried opposite-sex partnerships, and 19 (0.6%) same-sex married couples or partnerships. 277 households (8.8%) were one person and 112 (3.5%) had someone living alone who was 65 or older. The average household size was 4.14.  There were 2,803 families (88.8% of households); the average family size was 4.32.

The age distribution was 4,254 people (32.6%) under the age of 18, 1,783 people (13.7%) aged 18 to 24, 3,605 people (27.6%) aged 25 to 44, 2,499 people (19.1%) aged 45 to 64, and 917 people (7.0%) who were 65 or older.  The median age was 27.4 years. For every 100 females, there were 102.1 males.  For every 100 females age 18 and over, there were 102.0 males.

There were 3,320 housing units at an average density of 893.6 per square mile, of the occupied units 1,923 (60.9%) were owner-occupied and 1,233 (39.1%) were rented. The homeowner vacancy rate was 2.1%; the rental vacancy rate was 3.7%.  7,849 people (60.1% of the population) lived in owner-occupied housing units and 5,205 people (39.9%) lived in rental housing units.

2000
According to the census of 2000, there were 10,473 people in 2,390 households, including 2,143 families, in the city. There were 2,449 housing units at an average density of 706.2/sq  mi (272.5/km). The racial makeup of the city was 36.52% White, 0.74% African American, 0.93% Native American, 14.45% Asian, 0.08% Pacific Islander, 41.54% from other races, and 5.76% from two or more races. Hispanic or Latino of any race were 71.81% of the population.

Of the 2,390 households 60.7% had children under the age of 18 living with them, 68.2% were married couples living together, 14.3% had a female householder with no husband present, and 10.3% were non-families. 8.7% of households were one person and 3.8% were one person aged 65 or older. The average household size was 4.37 and the average family size was 4.57.

The age distribution was 37.7% under the age of 18, 12.5% from 18 to 24, 28.3% from 25 to 44, 15.2% from 45 to 64, and 6.4% 65 or older. The median age was 25 years. For every 100 females, there were 101.0 males. For every 100 women age 18 and over, there were 99.3 men.

The median household income was $32,500 and the median family income  was $33,939. Males had a median income of $22,249 versus $19,693 for females. The per capita income for the city was $9,231. About 20.8% of families and 25.2% of the population were below the poverty line, including 30.7% of those under age 18 and 20.9% of those age 65 or over.

Government
Livingston uses a council–manager form of government with a five-member city council, including the mayor of the city. As of February 2020, the current mayor of Livingston is Gurpal Samra.

Sister city 
  - Oga, Akita Prefecture, Japan

See also 
 List of cities in California
 Merced River
 Merced County, California

References

External links 
 

Incorporated cities and towns in California
Cities in Merced County, California
1922 establishments in California
Populated places established in 1922